Reza Dormishian is an Iranian film director, screenwriter and film producer. He has worked as assistant director with notable directors such as Dariush Mehrjui, Fereydoun Jeyrani, and Alireza Davood Nejad.

Career 
He started writing as a film critic in 1997 for several newspapers. He later worked as an executive editor for cinema books and magazines. He was an assistant to some prestigious Iranian filmmakers, including Dariush Mehrjui and Alireza Davood Nejad. He has also worked as a screenwriter. He started making short films and documentaries in 2002.

Hatred was his first feature film, produced independently in Istanbul. Hatred displays the frenzied love and hatred and two accounts from two phases in the life of an Iranian refugee couple in Istanbul, Turkey. The film was received well by critics and cinema writers and the Iranian critics gave it three awards (Best Directing, Best Cinematography, and Best Editing). Although Hatred was censored to be screened in Iran, it was screened and praised in various festivals such as the Competition Section of the 36th Montreal World Film Festival in Canada, Competition Section of the 28th Warsaw Film Festival in Poland, and Competition Section of the Camerimage Film Festival in Poland.

His second feature, I’m not angry!, was the most controversial film of the Iranian cinema in 2014. This social drama criticizes the Ahmadinejad era, and it was the only Iranian film present in the Panorama Section of 64th Berlin International Film Festival. I’m not angry! was screened in the 32nd Fajr Film Festival while 15 minutes of it had been censored, and it was faced with warm welcome by the audience and grave opposition by extremist groups, to the extent that the cinema authorities stopped its screening. As the hardliners and extremists were going to attack the closing ceremony of the festival with 15 buses of their men, the festival authorities forced Reza Dormishian not to receive his awards and to withdraw his film from the festival, and they announced in the closing ceremony that Reza Dormishian had waived his awards to maintain calmness in the Iranian cinema. The jury members, however, revealed the next day that the awards had indeed belonged to I’m not angry! and that Dormishian had agreed to resignation under pressure.

Screening of I’m not angry! in Iran has been banned since then.

Filmography

References

External links

 
 

1981 births
Living people
Iranian film directors
Iranian screenwriters
Iranian film producers